Days of Despair by Rajiva Wijesinha is a darker sequel to the author's political comedy Acts of Faith which came out in the early years of the racial and political strife in Sri Lanka.

1989 novels
Sri Lankan literature